Conteville-lès-Boulogne (literally Conteville near Boulogne) is a commune in the Pas-de-Calais department in the Hauts-de-France region of France.

Geography
The huge  forest of Boulogne forms the southernmost borders of the commune.

Population

Places of interest
 The church of St. Marie-Madeleine, dating from the sixteenth century.
 The eighteenth century chapel of Saint-Hubert.
 The seventeenth century manorhouse de la Motte.
 Remains of an old castle.

See also
Communes of the Pas-de-Calais department

References

Contevillelesboulogne